McCashin is a surname. Notable people with the surname include:

Arthur McCashin (1909–1988), American equestrian
Constance McCashin (born 1947), American psychotherapist and actor
Terry McCashin (1944–2017), New Zealand businessman

See also
McCashins Brewery, a New Zealand brewery